The Empire Award for Best Actress is an Empire Award presented annually by the British film magazine Empire to honor an actress who has delivered an outstanding performance in a leading role, while working within the film industry. The Empire Award for Best Actress is one of five ongoing awards which were first introduced at the 1st Empire Awards ceremony in 1996 (the others being Best Actor, Best Director, Best Film, and Best British Film), with Nicole Kidman receiving the award for her role in To Die For. Winners are voted by the readers of Empire magazine.

Since its inception, the award has been given to 20 actresses. Nicole Kidman has received the most awards in this category, with two awards. Cate Blanchett and Nicole Kidman were nominated on five occasions, more than any other actress. Daisy Ridley is the most recent winner in this category, for her role in Star Wars: The Last Jedi.

Winners and nominees
In the list below, winners are listed first in the colored row in boldface, followed by the other nominees. The number of the ceremony (1st, 2nd, etc.) appears in parentheses after the awards year, linked to the article (if any) on that ceremony.

1990s

2000s

2010s

Multiple awards and nominations

Multiple awards
The following individual received two or more Best Actress awards:

Multiple nominations
The following individuals received two or more Best Actress nominations:

Notes

References

External links

Actress
Film awards for lead actress